μT-Kernel is a real-time operating system (RTOS) designed for 16- and 8-bit microcontrollers. μT-Kernel was standardized by T-Engine Forum and later by the Institute of Electrical and Electronics Engineers (IEEE) IEEE Standards Association (IEEE SA) as the basis of IEEE 2050-2018.

An article comparing 9 RTOSs among which Micro T-Kernel was evaluated and given favorable remarks appeared in IEEE publication.

See also
 T-Kernel

References

External links
, TRON project

μT-Kernel Specifications
IEEE Publishes Standard Addressing Real-Time Architecture for Embedded Systems
Information about T-Engine, T-Kernel and μT-Kernel Programming
Introducing the μT-Kernel
μT-Kernel for M16C/62P source code and documentation

Embedded operating systems
IEEE standards
Internet of things
Operating system kernels
TRON project